Robert Lee Nadeau (born 1944) is a retired American professor in the English Department at George Mason University, where he began working in 1975 and from which he retired in 2012. His recent research focuses on integration between economic and environmental thinking. At George Mason, he founded the Global Environmental Network Center, and has argued vehemently against climate change deniers, who he said are on a "genocidal campaign".

Bibliography
 Robert Nadeau, Readings From the New Book on Nature, (Amherst, Mass.: University of Massachusetts Press, 1981).
 Robert Nadeau, Nature Talks Back, (Alexandria, Virginia: Orchises Press, 1984).
 Menas Kafatos and Robert Nadeau, The Conscious Universe: Part and Whole in Modern Physical Theory (New York: Springer Verlag, 1990).
 Robert Nadeau, Mind, Machines and Human Consciousness, (Chicago: Contemporary Books, 1991).
 Robert Nadeau, Sh/e Brain: Science and Sexual Politics (Westport, Connecticut: Praeger, 1996).
 Robert Nadeau and Menas Kafatos, The Non-Local Universe: The New Physics and Matters of the Mind (New York: Oxford University Press, 1999).
 Robert Nadeau, The Wealth of Nature: How Mainstream Economics Failed the Environment (New York: Columbia University Press, 2003).
 Robert Nadeau, The Environmental Endgame: Mainstream Economics, Ecological Disaster, and Human Survival (Piscataway, NJ: Rutgers University Press, 2006).

References

External links
 Personal website
 Biography at the Encyclopedia of Earth

1944 births
Living people
American academics of English literature